Philadelphia Mennonite High School was a private Mennonite high school in the  Fairmount neighborhood of Philadelphia, Pennsylvania. The school had approximately 100 students in 9th through 12th grades, and focused on college preparation. The school merged with, The City School - another Mennonite school, in 2014.

History
The school was founded in 1997, and opened for classes in the former St. Nicholas Ukrainian Catholic School building in the fall of 1998, with 45 students. The first graduating class was in 2000, with 10 students, all of whom were accepted for college admission.

The 24 students in the class of 2009 graduated on June 14, 2009.

Accreditation
The school is accredited with two agencies, which did their evaluation process together. The agencies are the Commission on Secondary Schools of the Middle States Association of Colleges and Schools, and the Mennonite Accreditation Agency of the Mennonite Education Agency.

Community

The Fairmount Civic Association  meets in the PMHS building, and the basement is used as a polling place for the 15th Ward, 18th Division.

The Liberti Church (Fairmount) formerly met at PMHS, and now meets at the Berean Institute.

References

Private high schools in Pennsylvania
Mennonite schools in the United States
Mennonitism in Pennsylvania
High schools in Philadelphia
Educational institutions established in 1997
1997 establishments in Pennsylvania
Fairmount, Philadelphia
Christian schools in Pennsylvania